"(I Know) I'm Losing You" is a 1966 hit single recorded by the Temptations for the Gordy (Motown) label, written by Cornelius Grant, Eddie Holland and Norman Whitfield, and produced by Norman Whitfield.

The group performed the song live on the CBS variety program The Ed Sullivan Show on May 28, 1967, and in a duet with Diana Ross & the Supremes later that year, on November 19, 1967.

Background
Billboard described the song as a "blues swinger with a solid dance beat and powerful vocal workout."  Cash Box said that "the ork is throbbing, the chorus is smooth and the group tells its sad tale in exquisite fashion."

Personnel
 Lead vocals by David Ruffin
 Background vocals by Eddie Kendricks, Paul Williams, Melvin Franklin and Otis Williams
 Guitar by Cornelius Grant
 Other instrumentation by The Funk Brothers
 Arrangements by Wade Marcus and Paul Riser

Chart performance
"(I Know) I'm Losing You" was a No. 1 hit on the Billboard R&B singles chart, and reached No. 8 on the Billboard Pop Singles chart. In Canada the song reached No. 21. While in the UK it reached No. 19

Later versions
"(I Know) I'm Losing You" was a 1970 version by Motown rock band Rare Earth for their Ecology album. Rare Earth's 10-minute recording was edited for single release and peaked at No. 7, one position higher than the Temptations' original on the U.S. pop charts. It also reached #15 in Canada.
Rod Stewart recorded a version in 1971 that was featured on his breakthrough album Every Picture Tells A Story. The single reached #24 on the Billboard Hot 100, credited as Rod Stewart With Faces and #13 in Canada. Stewart had previously performed the song with the Jeff Beck Group; live performances were recorded for BBC radio broadcast on the Saturday Club March 7, 1967.
The Undisputed Truth, a group assembled and produced solely by Norman Whitfield, recorded a cover version of the song in a psychedelic funk style for their 1975 album Cosmic Truth. 
During the 1980s, on the Dallas, Texas-based Oak Lawn Records label, the song was recorded by the group Uptown and transformed into an upbeat dance tune. This version achieved popularity at Dallas' famed Starck nightclub due to early play by DJ Rick Squillante and became a standard in many U.S. nightclubs, reaching the No. 80 spot on the Billboard Hot 100 in 1987.
Chicago-based recording artist Kanye West used the vocal samples from both Rare Earth and The Undisputed Truth covers in his song "Fade", which features vocals by Post Malone and Ty Dolla Sign from his seventh studio album, The Life of Pablo.

References 

1966 songs
1966 singles
1970 singles
1971 singles
1983 singles
The Temptations songs
Rare Earth (band) songs
Rod Stewart songs
Songs written by Norman Whitfield
Songs written by Eddie Holland
Songs written by Cornelius Grant
Song recordings produced by Norman Whitfield
Gordy Records singles
Mercury Records singles
Motown singles
Psychedelic soul songs
Songs about infidelity